2-Aminomuconic semialdehyde is a metabolite of tryptophan.

See also
 Muconic acid
 Ommochrome

References 

Conjugated aldehydes
Amino acids
Aldehydic acids
Enoic acids